Raymond Benjamin Thomas Hawthorne  (born 3 May 1936) is a New Zealand theatre director, and is regarded as one of the country's most senior performing arts practitioners.

Background 
Hawthorne grew up in Hawkes Bay. He used to ride a horse to his schooling at Pakipaki School (now Te Kura Pakipaki) and Hastings High School. At age five he won a primary school singing competition judged by Emma Natzke, the mother of Russian New Zealand opera singer Oscar Natzka. He also performed with Hawkes Bay community opera and theatrical companies.

Career 
In 1955 Hawthorne became a member of the New Zealand Players, the nation's first major professional theatre company. It was directed by Richard Campion, father of filmmaker Jane Campion. Granted a government bursary in 1957, Hawthorne studied at the Royal Academy of Dramatic Art. Following graduation he pursued a career as a performer but his interest moved towards directing and teaching. Returning to New Zealand in 1971, he joined the  Mercury Theatre under the directorship of Anthony Richardson. Within two years Hawthorne founded Theatre Corporate. The company helped bring to prominence such notable artists as Jennifer Ward-Lealand and Michael Hurst. Hawthorne remained director of the company until 1981.

Some of the plays he directed with Theatre Corporate include, The Fantastiks by Tom Jones, music by Harvey L Schmidt (1977), The Two Tigers by Brian McNeill (1977),  Pygmalion by George Bernard Shaw (1978),  A Doll's House by Henrik Ibsen (1979),  Cabaret by John Kander and Fred Ebb (1984). In 1982 Hawthorne became Director of the National Opera of New Zealand. He directed  Brecht/ Weills’ Rise and Fall of the City of Mahagonny and Benjamin Britten’s  The Turn of the Screw but the company financially failed and finished soon after.
In 1985 he was appointed Director of the  Mercury Theatre, a position he retained for seven years. During his tenure he directed numerous operas, musicals and plays. Hawthorne established an acting studio in 1992, The Actor's Space. In 1992 he also directed the first Auckland Theatre Company production, Lovelock's Dream Run by David Geary out of the ashes of the Mercury Theatre.

In 1997 he became the Head of Major in ‘Directing and Writing for Theatre and Screen’ at Unitec Institute of Technology. He was appointed Head of the School of Performing and Screen Arts in 2003.

He has acted and directed for Auckland Theatre Company numerous productions including Someone Who'll Watch Over Me, Travels With My Aunt,  The Judas Kiss, Waiting for Godot, A Midsummer Night's Dream, The Crucible and Sir  Roger Hall's Who Wants to be 100?

In 2011 he directed the inaugural production at Auckland's Q Theatre, Raise the Titanics. His other directing credits include Angels in America, Three Tall Women, The Herbal Bed,  Julius Caesar,  Cabaret,  Into the Woods, Travesties,  High Society,  Oliver! and  Guys and Dolls. He has acted in film and television projects including Children of the Dog Star, Mortimer's Patch,  Bread and Roses, Shortland Street and As Dreams Are Made On.

Honours and awards 
In the 2000 Queen's Birthday Honours, Hawthorne was appointed an Officer of the New Zealand Order of Merit, for services to the theatre.

Personal life 
Married to Elizabeth Hawthorne, he is the father of Emmeline Hawthorne and the late Sophia Hawthorne.

References

External links

 Raymond Hawthorne at Oxford Reference 
 Raymond Hawthorne at Playmarket 
 Raymond Hawthorne at Auckland Theatre Company 
 McNeill, Michael. "'Not a Bunch of Carmelite Monks", Art New Zealand 9, February–April 1978 
 
 Q Theatre 
 Auckland Theatre Company 

1936 births
Living people
New Zealand male stage actors
New Zealand male film actors
New Zealand theatre directors
Officers of the New Zealand Order of Merit
20th-century New Zealand male actors
21st-century New Zealand male actors